Kampung Bechah Resak is a village located in Tumpat District, Kelantan, Malaysia.
The nearest town is Pekan Chabang Empat Tok Mek Ngah.

References 

Tumpat District
Villages in Kelantan